Tetracha affinis is a species of tiger beetle in the subfamily Cicindelinae that was described by Dejean in 1825, and occurs in Brazil, Colombia, Suriname, and Venezuela.

References

Beetles described in 1825
Beetles of South America
Cicindelidae